Jarni may refer to:

Robert Jarni (born 1968), Croatian footballer
Järni, a village in Estonia
 Jarní píseň, a 1944 Czechoslovak film
 Jarní vody, a 1968 Czechoslovak film